Ina Nikulina (born 23 February 1995) is a Belarusian rower. She competed in the women's coxless pair event at the 2016 Summer Olympics.

References

External links
 

1995 births
Living people
Belarusian female rowers
Olympic rowers of Belarus
Rowers at the 2016 Summer Olympics
Place of birth missing (living people)
Rowers at the 2020 Summer Olympics